Min Dikkha (1515–1556, also known as Bahadur Shah, in the Arakanese language as Mong Tikkha) was ruler of the Kingdom of Mrauk U from 1554 to 1556. He was the heir-apparent of the kingdom for 22 years during the reign of his father, King Min Bin. Dikkha was an able military commander who led the Arakanese navy in Min Bin's conquest of Bengal in 1532–1533. He led the Royal Arakanese Navy in the Taungoo–Ava War (1538–45), and in the Taungoo–Mrauk-U War (1545–47). He built the Koe-thaung Temple, the largest of all temples in Mrauk U during his short reign.

Notes

References

Bibliography
 
 
 

Monarchs of Mrauk-U
1515 births
1556 deaths
16th century in the Mrauk-U Kingdom
16th-century Burmese monarchs